The Women's 100m Freestyle event at the 2007 World Aquatics Championships occurred on 29 March (prelims and semifinals) and March (30) at Rod Laver Arena in Melbourne, Australia. 135 swimmers were entered in the event.

Four days prior to the event—and still during the 2007 Worlds--Lisbeth Lenton set the Championship Record (CR) in the event on the opening leg of Australia's 4 × 100 m freestyle relay with her 53.42. The previous record had been 54.01 by China's Le Jingyi from the Rome 1994 (on 5 September 1994).

The existing records at the start of the event:
World Record (WR): 53.30, Britta Steffen (Germany), 2 August 2006, in Budapest, Hungary.
Championship Record (CR): 53.42, Lisbeth Lenton (Australia), 25 March 2007, Melbourne 2007 (4x100 Free Relay) (Mar.25.2007).

Finals

Semifinals

Preliminaries

References

Swimming at the 2007 World Aquatics Championships
2007 in women's swimming